Joseph Günzburg (Osip Gavrilovich Gintsburg, Осип Гаврилович Гинцбург (or Iosif-Evzel, Иосиф-Евзель); 1812 in Vitebsk – 12 January 1878 in Paris) was a Russian financier and philanthropist who became a baron in 1874. He was the son of Gabriel Günzburg and the father of Horace Günzburg.

Having acquired great wealth during the Crimean war, Günzburg established a banking firm at St. Petersburg. There he began to labor on behalf of the welfare of the Jewish community. In November 1861, he was appointed by the Russian government member of the rabbinical commission, the meetings of which lasted five months. He exerted himself to raise the standard of the education of the Jews, and to this effect he founded in 1863 with the permission of the Russian government the Society for the Promotion of Culture Among the Jews, of which he filled the office of president till his death. Owing to Günzburg's efforts, the regulations concerning the military service of the Jews were in 1874 made identical with those of the peoples of other creeds. He also instituted a fund for the Talmud Torah religious school of Vilna, his father's native town. The Günzburgs were ennobled by the Grand Duke of Hesse-Darmstadt in 1871, and Joseph received the title of baron on 2 August 1874.

Bibliography
 Fuenn, Keneset Yisrael, p. 460;
 Archives Israélites, 1878, p. 89

External links
 

1812 births
1878 deaths
People from Vitebsk
People from Vitebsky Uyezd
Belarusian Jews
Jews from the Russian Empire
Jewish bankers
Günzburg family
Bankers from the Russian Empire
Russian Hebraists
19th-century businesspeople from the Russian Empire
Russian landowners
Barons of the Russian Empire
Hessian nobility